Firelands High School is a public high school in Oberlin, Ohio in the United States.

Firelands High School absorbed South Amherst High School and its school district during the summer of 1988.

The school is located in Henrietta Township (at 10643 Vermilion Road) and serves the townships of Brownhelm, Camden, Florence (in Erie County), Henrietta, New Russia, and the village of South Amherst.

The school's official colors are red and white, and their teams' nickname is "Falcons." School colors often include black, but it is not an official school color. The school is a member of the Stars division of the Lorain County League as of the 2019–2020 school year. Their primary rival is the Vermilion High School Sailors.

References

External links
 Firelands High School website
 Firelands Local School district history

High schools in Lorain County, Ohio
Public high schools in Ohio